C4MIP (more fully, Coupled Climate Carbon Cycle Model Intercomparison Project) is a joint project between the International Geosphere-Biosphere Programme (IGBP) and the World Climate Research Programme (WCRP). It is a model intercomparison project along the lines of the Atmospheric Model Intercomparison Project, but for global climate models that include an interactive carbon cycle .

External links 

 https://web.archive.org/web/20050402053554/http://climate.ornl.gov/c4mip/
 

Numerical climate and weather models